Isaac Bouckley (born 18 April 1994) is a Canadian retired Paralympic swimmer who competed at international swimming competitions. He is a double Parapan American Games silver medalist and competed at the 2012 and 2016 Summer Paralympics.

References

External links
 
 

1994 births
Living people
Paralympic swimmers of Canada
Swimmers at the 2012 Summer Paralympics
Swimmers at the 2016 Summer Paralympics
Medalists at the 2015 Parapan American Games
Canadian male breaststroke swimmers
Sportspeople from Oshawa
Canadian male freestyle swimmers
S10-classified Paralympic swimmers